Juan Pablo García Contreras (born 24 November 1981) is a Mexican former professional footballer who played as an attacking midfielder. After his retirement, he became depressed and alcoholic but has since recovered.

Club career
Garcia was trained in the FC Atlas youth system and made his debut in the Verano 2000 season against Pachuca CF. He signed with Chivas USA in July 2005 and returned to Mexico following the 2006 Major League Soccer season and signed with CD Tigres UANL.

Nicknamed Loquito, he last played for Mérida.

International career
He played for the Mexico national team at the 2004 Olympics. He received his first cap for the senior national team on July 10 in a 2005 CONCACAF Gold Cup match against Guatemala.

Honours
Mexico U23
CONCACAF Olympic Qualifying Championship: 2004

References

External links
 
 
 

1981 births
Living people
Footballers from Guadalajara, Jalisco
Association football midfielders
Mexican footballers
Mexico international footballers
Olympic footballers of Mexico
Footballers at the 2004 Summer Olympics
2005 CONCACAF Gold Cup players
Atlas F.C. footballers
Chivas USA players
Tigres UANL footballers
Chiapas F.C. footballers
C.D. Veracruz footballers
Club Puebla players
C.F. Mérida footballers
Liga MX players
Major League Soccer players
Mexican expatriate footballers
Expatriate soccer players in the United States
Mexican expatriate sportspeople in the United States
Footballers at the 2003 Pan American Games
Pan American Games bronze medalists for Mexico
Medalists at the 2003 Pan American Games
Pan American Games medalists in football